U-Sing is published by software publisher Mindscape and developed by their French division and has been done so in partnership with the world's largest music publisher, Universal Music. U-SING is a karaoke-style video game produced exclusively for the Wii. The initial release date for this product is 30 October 2009, globally. An article is needed for the sequel, U-Sing Girls Night which is out now.

Gameplay
Gameplay is similar to other karaoke console games currently available, such as SingStar, where the player(s) choose a song from a list of tunes on the disc. The player(s) are then to sing the tune of the song through a Logitech microphone connected to the Wii. The software then measures the player's performance in voice tonality and rhythm and scores the singer according to their accuracy.

Network features
In 2010, you will be able to download more of tracks from the huge list of Universal Music’s catalogue, as well as other licensed tracks from popular record labels. Available through the WiiWare on the Wii Shop Channel on your Wii console and can be purchased using Nintendo Points.

Key features
A specific playlist for each country
30 hits to sing with the original clips from Universal top artists
High precision speech recognition using VoxLer Technology, accurately evaluating tune and rhythm
3 level of difficulty, short and long version available for each song
From up to 2 players with 2 microphones
Listening from the performances
7 fun and addictive gameplays : Training, Solo, Duo, Duel, Battle, Jukebox, Medley

Track list
(United Kingdom, Australia & Netherlands)

Black Kids - I'm Not Gonna Teach Your Boyfriend How to Dance With You
Boyzone - Better
Coldplay - Viva La Vida
Culture Club - Do you really want to hurt me
Duffy - Mercy
Esmée Denters - Outta Here
Gloria Gaynor - I Will Survive
Jackson 5 - ABC
James Morrison - Wonderful World
Just Jack - The day I died
Keane - Somewhere Only We Know
Kool & the Gang - Celebration
La Roux - Bulletproof
Lady Gaga - Eh, Eh (Nothing Else I Can Say)
Lily Allen - 22
Lionel Richie - All Night Long
Mika - Love Today
Mr Hudson and the Library - Too Late, Too Late
Orson - No Tomorrow
Sam Brown - Stop
Snow Patrol - Crack the Shutters
Stereophonics - Have a Nice Day
Texas - I Don't Want a Lover
The All-American Rejects - I Wanna
The Cure - Boys Don't Cry
The Kooks - Always Where I Need To Be
The Mamas & the Papas - California Dreamin'
The Pussycat Dolls - When I Grow Up
The Saturdays - Issues
The Temptations - My Girl

There is also a new U-Sing game called U-Sing 2.

References

External links
Official website

2009 video games
Karaoke video games
Video games developed in France
Wii games
Wii-only games